Aatolana springthorpei is a species of crustaceans in the family Cirolanidae, first described by Stephen John Keable in 1998. 

It is benthic shrimp found in tropical waters at depths of 200 m to 203 m on the continental shelves of Queensland and New South Wales. Like other species in this genus it is a scavenger. The males are similar to the females,  and the species is most similar to A rapax.

References

External links 

 Aatolana springthorpei occurrence data from GBIF

Cymothoida
Crustaceans of Australia
Crustaceans described in 1998